Lisa Hewitt is a Canadian country music singer. Hewitt released her self-titled debut album on the independent Socan Records in 1999. Her second album, The Road I Chose, was released in 2004 by Royalty Records. Its first single, "One of These Goodbyes," reached the Top 25 on the Radio & Records Canadian country singles chart. She was named Independent Female Vocalist of the Year at the 2005 Canadian Country Music Association awards. Hewitt was featured in 2006 on the CMT series Plucked, a documentary about six country music stars in training. In 2009, Hewitt was signed to 306 Records. Her third album, Fearless, was released in March 2009.

Discography

Studio albums

Singles

Music videos

Awards and nominations

References

External links

Lisa Hewitt at CMT

Canadian women country singers
Canadian country singer-songwriters
Living people
306 Records artists
Year of birth missing (living people)